Ingrid Ella Deltenre (born 25 August 1960) is a Dutch-Swiss manager who was director of the German-speaking broadcaster Schweizer Fernsehen from 2004 to 2009 and the director-general of the broadcasters association, the European Broadcasting Union, between 2010 and 2017.

Early life and education
On 25 August 1960, Deltenre was born a Dutch national in Wettingen in the Swiss canton of Aargau to Dutch parents. Her father worked as an engineer at the electronics and mechanical engineering group Brown, Boveri & Cie and, therefore the family frequently resided abroad for long periods of time. Between 1982 and 1989, Deltenre studied at the University of Zurich for a master's degree in education, journalism and biological anthropology.

Career
Deltenre went on to work at Ringier media group variously as managing director, head of marketing as well as project manager of business development from 1991 to 1998. She was chief marketing officer and member of the executive committee at Swisscard between 1998 and 1999, and also worked at multimedia marketer  as its director from 1999 to 2004. She was the publishing director of the business newspaper  for half a decade.

On 1 January 2004, Deltenre was elected director of the German-speaking broadcaster Schweizer Fernsehen (SF), succeeding . She was the first woman to be appointed head of Swiss German television, and the appointment was considered controversial as critics felt she had too little journalistic experience. Deltenre was elected by the EBU Executive Board to succeed  as the director-general of the Geneva-based broadcasters association, the European Broadcasting Union (EBU), in June 2009 and left SF to take up her new post on 1 January 2010. She oversaw the direction of the Eurovision Song Contest and negotiated the rights of the broadcast of major sporting events for members of the EBU. In 2015, Deltenre received a second term as EBU's director-general that would last from January 2016 to January 2019. She left the EBU in September 2017 to focus on her responsibilities on various boards, providing them her knowledge of digitisation, environmental, social and governance, human resources and marketing. Deltenre was succeeded as director-general by Noel Curran, the Director-General of RTÉ.

Deltenre was president of the board of directors of SF's production company  from April 2005 to 18 November 2010. On 18 May 2016, she was made a member of the board of directors of Deutsche Post. Deltenre is also a non-executive member of the board directors of Banque cantonale vaudoise as well as its nomination, promotions and compensation committee. She is a non-executive member of the board of directors of both Givaudan (and of its Compensation Committee and the Nomination and Governance Committee) as well as Agence France-Presse and Sunrise UPC. Deltenre is also on the board of directors of Akara Funds, and is chair of the University of Zurich's supervisory body of its executive MBA. Deltenre received the 2019 Swiss Board Member of the Year.

Personal life
Her partner is the public relations consultant . They do not have children; being childfree was a choice Deltenre made when she was younger to ensure her independence and to avoid her taking on parental duties. In late 2009, she became a naturalised Swiss citizen.

References

External links
 
 

1960 births
Living people
People from Baden District, Aargau
University of Zurich alumni
20th-century Dutch women
21st-century Dutch women
Naturalised citizens of Switzerland
Women television executives
20th-century newspaper publishers (people) by nationality
Women in publishing